The 1920 Marion Cadets football team was an American football team that represented the Marion Military Institute as an independent during the 1920 college football season. The Cadets compiled an overall record of 2–5.

Schedule

References

Marion
Marion Cadets football seasons
Marion Cadets football